Ralf Schumann (born 10 June 1962) is a former German 25 m rapid fire pistol shooter. He is a three-time Olympic Champion and twice the World Champion. One of the most decorated shooters of the modern era, he is the first of two sport shooters to have won three Olympic gold medals in one individual event (25 metre rapid fire pistol) and became the first of three sport shooters to have won three Olympic individual gold medals. He won the gold medals for the 25 metre rapid fire pistol event at the 1992, 1996 and 2004 Olympics and also won two silver medals at this event, becoming the most successful Olympic shooter at this event. Schumann participated in seven consecutive Olympic Games from 1988 to 2012, setting a new record for most Olympic appearances by a German athlete.

Career
His international breakthrough came in the years before the Seoul Olympics in 1988, where he was considered the most likely winner. However, he was beaten by Afanasijs Kuzmins of the Soviet Union (later Latvia) by 598 to 597 in the qualification round, and could not close the gap in the finals as Kuzmins achieved a perfect 100. 
After this, the targets were changed, lowering results considerably, but Schumann's hegemony has only increased. He won the 1990 World Championships and the 1992 Olympics. He scored 596 points on several occasions before raising the World Record to 597 in 1995, which he equalled in 2000. After the major rule change in 2005, he beat the world record again with 588 points, bettered by Sergei Alifirenko later the same year. He also held the pre-2005 final World Record and the Olympic records (from 1996), excelling in the four-second final shooting.

Being the favourite in every competition he entered, it was natural that his failures to win received some attention. Most notable among these is his performance in the Sydney Olympics in 2000, when at the prospect of winning his third Olympic gold medal (something no RFP shooter before has managed) he only finished fifth. However, his results since then have proved that this was not the beginning of a long-term decline, and in the Athens Olympics in 2004, he finally won his third Olympic gold.

Sponsorships
Ralf has worked as a precision mechanic during his shooting career, and his employers have sponsored his competitive shooting by offering Ralf a 3-month paid leave of absence each year to train.  He also designed a custom .22 caliber pistol which is sold by Italian manufacturer Pardini.

Personal life
Schumann was born in Meissen in Saxony. He took up pistol shooting in 1977 and was eventually trained at the East German national shooting arena in Suhl, Thuringia. He has on several occasions been voted the athlete of the year in Thuringia. He now lives in nearby Stockheim, Bavaria. His wife, Anke Völker-Schumann is also a shooter; she joined Ralf in competing at the 1988, 1996, and 2000 Olympics.

See also
List of multiple Olympic gold medalists in one event
List of multiple Summer Olympic medalists
List of athletes with the most appearances at Olympic Games
World Cup Multi-Medalists

References

External links
 

1962 births
Living people
German male sport shooters
Olympic shooters of Germany
Olympic shooters of East Germany
ISSF pistol shooters
People from Meissen
Shooters at the 1988 Summer Olympics
Shooters at the 1992 Summer Olympics
Shooters at the 1996 Summer Olympics
Shooters at the 2000 Summer Olympics
Shooters at the 2004 Summer Olympics
Shooters at the 2008 Summer Olympics
Shooters at the 2012 Summer Olympics
Olympic gold medalists for Germany
Olympic silver medalists for Germany
Olympic silver medalists for East Germany
Olympic medalists in shooting
Medalists at the 2008 Summer Olympics
Medalists at the 2004 Summer Olympics
Medalists at the 1996 Summer Olympics
Medalists at the 1992 Summer Olympics
Medalists at the 1988 Summer Olympics
Sportspeople from Saxony